Julio Alejandro Gallego González (born 24 December 1947), frequently referred as Julio Gallegos, is a Chilean former professional footballer who played as a midfielder for clubs in Chile, El Salvador and Ecuador.

Career
His first club in the top level was Audax Italiano in 1969, staying with the club until 1973, having a stint with San Antonio Unido in 1970.

A well remembered player of San Antonio Unido, he won the Copa Isidro Corbinos in 1970, making 10 appearances and scoring 3 goals.

In Chile, he also played for Rangers, Deportes Arica and Deportes La Serena.

In 1973, he was called up to the Chile national team.

After football
As a football coach, he coached a youth team in a tournament called Del Pacífico a la Fama (From the Pacific Ocean to fame) in 1979. Then, he improved in Chile and abroad and has worked as coach at youth level for academies such as Lyons School.

He has led the Agrupación Social y Deportivo de Ex-Jugadores Profesionales San Antonio Unido (Social and Sports Association of Former Professional Players of San Antonio Unido).

Honours
San Antonio Unido
 Copa Isidro Corbinos: 

Milagro SC
 Segunda Categoría: 1982

References

External links
 Julio Gallego at PlaymakerStats.com
 

1947 births
Living people
Place of birth missing (living people)
Chilean footballers
Chilean expatriate footballers
Chile international footballers
Audax Italiano footballers
San Antonio Unido footballers
C.D. Luis Ángel Firpo footballers
Rangers de Talca footballers
San Marcos de Arica footballers
Deportes La Serena footballers
Chilean Primera División players
Primera B de Chile players
Salvadoran Primera División players
Ecuadorian Serie B players
Chilean expatriate sportspeople in El Salvador
Chilean expatriate sportspeople in Ecuador
Expatriate footballers in El Salvador
Expatriate footballers in Ecuador
Association football midfielders
Chilean football managers